Brucella ovis is a Gram-negative coccobacillus from the Brucellaceae family.  Along with Brucella melitensis, it is responsible for causing ovine brucellosis, which is a notifiable disease. B. ovis can be transmitted by the stable fly. Infection causes severe inflammation of the epididymis, particularly the tail.

References
Brucella ovis, reviewed and published by Wikivet at http://en.wikivet.net/Brucella_ovis, accessed 24/08/2011.

Hyphomicrobiales